SWR Sound Corporation was a specialist manufacturer of bass guitar amplifiers, preamps, speaker cabinets, and acoustic guitar amplifiers.

History 
The company was founded as SWR Engineering, Inc. by its namesake, Steve W. Rabe. Rabe was known for his engineering work at Acoustic Control Corporation. After extensive research with top Los Angeles studio bassists, SWR released its first commercial product in 1984, the PB-200 hybrid tube/solid-state bass guitar amplifier. The first 5 units were manufactured by hand in a garage in the San Fernando Valley. This model soon became the SM-400.  SWR then pursued development of a speaker cabinet to accompany its amps. In 1986, SWR released the Goliath, a 4 x 10" full-range speaker cabinet with a built-in horn tweeter, a first for bass cabinets.

The company's name was changed to SWR Sound Corporation on 1 December 1997 as part of a restructuring plan. Rabe sold the company to accountant Daryl Paul Jamison and soon created a new company, Raven Labs. SWR was based in Sylmar, California until January 1999, when it moved to the former Cetec Gauss speaker factory in nearby Sun Valley, California. On 2 June 2003, Jamison sold SWR to Fender Musical Instruments Corporation for a rumored $8 million, after a previous year of lagging SWR sales and dwindling market share. Jamison reportedly tried to sell to Fender a year earlier for a larger sum, but this failed to materialize.

SWR is now a brand in Fender's portfolio rather than an independent company. Its products were manufactured at Fender's facilities in Corona, California and Ensenada, Baja California. Fender is headquartered in Scottsdale, Arizona.

FMIC ceased all SWR production in early 2013.

Products 
The Workingman's Series of amplifiers was redesigned and upgraded to the WorkingPro Series - amplifier heads and speaker cabinets in 2005, and amplifier/speaker combos in 2006.

At the 2007 Winter NAMM (National Association of Music Merchants) Show, SWR introduced the SM-1500 head, which combined the hybrid tube/solid-state platform with some Fender-era innovations, including a tube-driven compressor. At 1500 watts (in bridged mode at 4 ohms), the SM-1500 was the most powerful toroidal-based amplifier on the market.

The July NAMM Show featured the new Natural Blonde combo. Built on the platform of the Acoustic Series California Blonde, the Natural Blonde is a 2-channel 2X8" combo designed especially for acoustic bassists. Bass Player magazine gave it a very favorable review and Editor's Award in the August, 2007 issue.

External links
 SWR Sound website

Guitar amplifier manufacturers
Privately held companies based in California
Companies established in 1983
Audio equipment manufacturers of the United States